Anette Prehn (born 1975) is a Danish author, sociologist, keynote speaker and MD of Centre for Brain-Based Leadership and Learning.

She is the author of five non-fiction books about the rules of the brain, which are published in seven languages, among these English, Chinese, Russian and German.

Her book Play Your Brain was published in 2011 by Marshall Cavendish International and is her first book written in English.

In 2015-2016, Anette Prehn’s BRAINSMART trilogy was published in Danish. The series contain Brainsmart Parenting,  Brainsmart Leadership and Brainsmart Pedagogy. Currently, Anette Prehn is writing a series of seven mini books for the 10+ year olds.

The Danish schools and education publication Folkeskolen writes of Hjernesmarte Børn "Science communication at a high level that connects modern neurology with classical social psychology. The book is also reviewed in the Danish national newspaper Politiken by professor Svend Brinkmann and was featured in the article "Goodbye Freud, Hello Amygdala" in Dagbladet Information.

Anette Prehn is blogging about Brainsmart Leadership and Brainsmart children on Brainsmart.today

Books 
Ansvar (Dafolo, 2020) 
Afledte effekter People'sPress, 2019) 
Udbryderkongen og Indbrudstyven (Dafolo, 2019) 
FLIP (People'sPress, 2018) 
Din kreative hjerne (Dafolo, 2018) 
Tag nye billeder med hjernen (Dafolo, 2018) 
Giv hjernen plads til udvikling (Dafolo, 2018) 
Sov dig til en bedre hjerne (Dafolo, 2017) 
Gør hjernen til en medspiller (2017), Dafolo. 
Bliv ven med hjernens amygdala (2017), Dafolo. 
Stierne i hjernen (2017), Dafolo. 
Hjernesmart Ledelse (2016), People's Press. 
Hjernesmarte Børn (2015), People's Press. 
Hjernesmart Pædagogik (2016), Dafolo. 
Create Reframing Mindsets Through Framestorm (artikel i NeuroLeadership Journal, Issue Four, 2012)
Play your Brain (2011), Marshall Cavendish International. 
Coach dig selv (2010), Gyldendal Business Publishing. 
Coaching i perspektiv (s.m. Kim Gørtz, Hans Reitzels, 2008)

References 

Living people
1975 births
Danish women writers
Danish children's writers
Danish women children's writers
Danish sociologists